"Monochrome Rainbow" is a song by Japanese singer Tommy heavenly6, and first single for her fourth album. Monochrome Rainbow was released on October 26, 2011, and debuted at number 14 on the Oricon singles chart. "Monochrome Rainbow" was Tommy heavenly6's first official single since 2008 and first official single with Warner Music Japan. "Monochrome Rainbow" was also used as the second season ending song for the anime, Bakuman.

Track listing
The official track listing of the double A-side single was posted to Tommy heavenly6's official site on September 9, 2011.

Notes
 I'm Your Devil (iTunes Bonus Track) is a different version than released on the I'm Your Devil promotional single.
 I'm Your Devil (Halloween Remix) contains additional vocals by James De Barrado.

Music videos
Previews for the Monochrome Rainbow and I'm Your Devil music videos premiered on Kawase's official YouTube on October 28, 2011. The six-minute version of "I'm Your Devil" debuted on November 8, 2011. The unreleased full length videos for Monochrome Rainbow and I'm Your Devil will be included on a DVD with the limited edition release of the album.

References

External links
Official Site Warner Music Group (Japanese)

2011 singles
Anime songs
Tomoko Kawase songs
Songs written by Tomoko Kawase